Pablo Campana (born 16 December 1972 in Quito, Ecuador) is an Ecuadorian entrepreneur, former Minister of Commerce,
 and former male tennis player from Ecuador.

He holds a Bachelors of Science in Business Administration from Universidad Del Pacífico – Ecuador and an MBA from Instituto de Desarrollo Empresarial (IDE)

He has held various positions in Consorcio Nobis, and is currently CEO and founder of Millenium S.A.

Tennis career
Campana represented his native country in the doubles competition at the 1996 Summer Olympics in Atlanta, partnering Nicolás Lapentti. The pair was eliminated in the second round there.

The right-hander Campana represented Ecuador in the Davis Cup from 1990 to 1997, posting an 11–4 record in singles and a 7–2 record in doubles in fourteen ties played.

Campana's highest ranking in singles was world No. 165, which he reached on 9 September 1996. His highest doubles ranking was World No. 162, which he reached on 23 September 1996.

In early 1997, at 24 years of age, and after learning he was going to become a father, he retired from professional tennis.

Career finals

See also
 List of Ecuadorian Ironman

References

External links
 
 
 
 

1972 births
Living people
Sportspeople from Quito
Ecuadorian male tennis players
Olympic tennis players of Ecuador
Tennis players at the 1996 Summer Olympics
South American Games medalists in tennis
South American Games gold medalists for Ecuador
South American Games silver medalists for Ecuador
Competitors at the 1994 South American Games
Competitors at the 1998 South American Games
Government ministers of Ecuador